Improved Sound Limited is a German krautrock group formed in 1961.
The band started at Willstätter School in Nuremberg with the name "Pyjamas Skiffle Group". From 1964 to 1966, they changed their name to "Blizzards" and backed pop singer Roy Black at 33 shows. The name "Improved Sound Limited" appears at 1966 and remains, except for a brief period during 1976 when CBS advised them to change to the name "Condor".

The band specialized in making soundtracks for German television series and for the films from the directors Michael Verhoeven and Wim Wenders. Properly speaking, Bernd Linstädt wasn't a musician of the group, but he wrote all the lyrics and had a real impact on the band.

Band members
 Johnny Fickert (vocals, alto sax, flute, percussion), deceased in 2009
 Axel Linstädt (composition, guitars, keyboards, vocals)
 Uli Ruppert (bass), deceased in 2017
 Rolf Gröschner (drums)
 Bernd Linstädt (lyrics)

Discography

Singles
 1966: It Is You / We Are Alone (Polydor)
 1969: Sing Your Song / Marvin Is Dead (Polydor)
 1969: Hoppe hoppe Reiter / I'm Exhausted (Cornet)
 1970: Oedipus / Where Will The Salmon Spawn (United Artists)
 1976: Soundtrack of Kings of the Road (Filmverlag der Autoren)

LPs
 1969: Engelchen macht weiter – hoppe, hoppe Reiter (Cornet) – Soundtrack of Up the Establishment
 1971: Improved Sound Limited (Liberty)
 1973: Catch A Singing Bird On The Road (CBS)
 1976: Rathbone Hotel (CBS)

CDs
 2001: Improved Sound Limited (Long Hair Music)
 2001: Catch A Singing Bird On The Road (Long Hair Music)
 2002: Rathbone Hotel (Long Hair Music)
 2002: Road Trax (Long Hair Music)
 2003: The Final Foreword (Long Hair Music)
 2004: Box de 6 CDs: The Ultimate Collection (Long Hair Music)

References

External links 
 Official site
 Participation in Kings of the Road by Wim Wenders

German rock music groups
Krautrock musical groups